Hardware is the fifth studio album by the Swiss hard rock band Krokus. It did not match the success of their previous album, Metal Rendez-vous, going only Gold in Switzerland. However, the album entered the charts in the US, UK and other European countries.

UK-based company Rock Candy Records reissued the album on CD in 2014.

The 1981 exploitation film Mad Foxes features the songs "Easy Rocker" and "Celebration."

Track listing
All songs by Fernando von Arb and Chris von Rohr, except where indicated
Side one
 "Celebration" - 3:23
 "Easy Rocker" - 5:28
 "Smelly Nelly" (Tommy Kiefer, von Arb, von Rohr) - 3:42
 "Mr. 69" - 3:02
 "She's Got Everything" - 3:58

Side two
"Burning Bones" (von Arb, von Rohr, Marc Storace) - 3:37
 "Rock City" - 4:47
 "Winning Man" - 5:34
 "Mad Racket" - 4:02

Personnel
 Krokus
 Marc Storace – lead vocals
 Fernando von Arb – rhythm guitar, keyboards, bass, backing vocals
 Tommy Kiefer – lead guitar, backing vocals
 Chris von Rohr – bass, drums, backing vocals, percussion, keyboards
 Freddy Steady – drums, percussion, backing vocals
 Jürg Naegeli – keyboards, bass, backing vocals

 Production
 Mark Dearnley, Nick Rogers – engineers
 Ian Cooper – mastering at The Townhouse, London

Charts

Album

Singles

References

Krokus (band) albums
1981 albums
Ariola Records albums